The 1939 Massachusetts State Aggies football team represented Massachusetts State College in the 1939 college football season. The team was coached by Elbert Carraway and played its home games at Alumni Field in Amherst, Massachusetts. Mass State finished the season with a record of 2–5–2.

Schedule

See also
Texas A&M University

Massachusetts State
UMass Minutemen football seasons
Massachusetts State Aggies football